The Valley of Hate is a 1924 American silent action film directed by Russell Allen and starring Raymond McKee, Helen Ferguson and Earl Metcalfe.

Synopsis
A young man in South Carolina inherits property in a valley he has never visited before. On arriving he is mistaken by the locals for a revenue officer intent on enforcing the Volstead Act on Prohibition. As the whole area lives off the moonshining trade, this prevents problems - particularly when he falls in love with the daughter of the head of the local producers.

Cast
 Raymond McKee as Harvey Swope
 Helen Ferguson as 	Milly Hendricks
 Earl Metcalfe as Lem Darley
 Wilfred Lucas as Old Jim Darley
 Ralph Yearsley as Bob Darley
 Helen Lynch as 	Maurine Foster

References

Bibliography
 Connelly, Robert B. The Silents: Silent Feature Films, 1910-36, Volume 40, Issue 2. December Press, 1998.
 Munden, Kenneth White. The American Film Institute Catalog of Motion Pictures Produced in the United States, Part 1. University of California Press, 1997.

External links
 

1924 films
1920s action films
American silent feature films
American action films
American black-and-white films
Films set in South Carolina
1920s English-language films
1920s American films
Silent action films
English-language action films